The Kurukh or Oraon, also spelt Uraon, or Dhangar (Kurukh: Karḵẖ and Oṛāōn) are a Dravidian speaking ethnolinguistic group inhabiting Chhotanagpur Plateau and adjoining areas - mainly the Indian states of Jharkhand, West Bengal, Odisha and Chhattisgarh. They predominantly  speak Kurukh as their native language, which belongs to the Dravidian language family. In Maharashtra, Oraon people are also known as Dhangad or Dhangar.

Traditionally, Oraons depended on the forest and farms for their ritual practices and livelihoods, but in recent times, they have become mainly settled agriculturalists. Many Oraon migrated to tea gardens of Assam, West Bengal and Bangladesh as well as to countries like Fiji, Guyana, Trinidad and Tobago and Mauritius during British rule, where they were known as Hill Coolies. They are listed as a Scheduled Tribe for the purpose of India's reservation system.

Etymology
According to Edward Tuite Dalton, "Oraon" is an exonym assigned by neighboring Munda people, meaning "to roam". They call themselves Kurukh. According to Sten Konow, Uraon will mean man as in the Dravidian Kaikadi language, the word Urapai, Urapo and Urang means Man. The word Kurukh may be derived from the word Kur or Kurcana means Shout and stammer. So Kurukh will mean a speaker.

History
According to the Indian Anthropological Society, Konkan is said to be the original home of the Kurukh tribes from where they migrated to the Chota Nagpur Plateau. The group is said to have settled in the Chota Nagpur Plateau by 100 CE.

There are three opinion of scholar about origin of Kurukh people. According to Sarat Chandra Roy, Kurukh people might have migrated from Coorg in South India. In 1987, Elefenbein proposed Bloch's hypothesis, in which he proposed the Brahui tribe migrated from Baluchistan to Sindh where Brahui is still spoken, and the Rohtasgarh and Rajmahal hills. Those who migrated to Rohtasgarh were Kurukh and Rajmahal hills were Malto. According to another opinion, Kurukh people were living in Indus valley civilization, then they migrated to South and Central India after the decline of the Indus valley civilization due to droughts and floods in 2500 BCE. During the British Period, Kurukh people rebelled against the British East India Company authority and local Zamindars against tax imposition. The Budhu Bhagat led the Lakra rebellion which is also known as the Kol uprising in 1832. According to the writings of Colonel Edward Tuite Dalton, Oraon claimed that they were settled in Gujurat, then they were expelled from there. Then they settled in Kalinjar, where they fought with Lowrik Sowrik of Palipiri and were defeated. Then they came to Rohtasgarh and were driven out by Muslims during the reign of Akbar. Then they settled in Chotanagpur. According to Dalton, Oraon were settled in Chotanagpur before the reign of Akbar and possibly some Oraon were in Rohtas hills when Rohtasgarh fort was constructed by Muslims. According to him the Oraon language is similar to Tamil, but some words spoken by Oraon are of Sanskrit origin due to their living with Sanskrit and Prakrit speaking people in the past. The physical features of Oraon are the darkest but those who live in mixed settlements have varieties of features.

Jatra Bhagat led civil disobedience movement Tana Bhagat Movement from 1914 to 1920. After independence of India, They listed as a Scheduled Tribe for the purpose of India's reservation system.

Society
The Kurukh tribe is patrilocal and patrilineal. Kurukhs are divided into many exogamous clans. Clans names among the Kurukh are taken from plants, animals and objects. Some important clans are:

 Addo (ox)
 Aind (a fish)
 Alla (dog)
 Bakula (Heron)
 Bando (wild cat)
 Bara (Banyan)
 Barwa (wild dog)
 Beck (Salt)
 Chidra (Squirrel)
 Edgo (Mouse)
 Ekka or kachhap (Turtle)
 Gari (monkey)
 Gede (Duck)
 Gidhi (vulture)
 Halman (langur)
 Keond (a fruit)
 Khoya (wild dog)
 Kinduar (a fish)
 Kosuar (a fish)
 Kiro (a fruit)
 Kiss (pig)
 Kerketta (Hedge- sparrow)
 Kokro (cock)
 Kujur ( A medicinal plant)
 Lakra (Tiger)
 Minz (a fish)
 Khetta or Nag (Cobra)
 Panna (Iron)
 Tido (a fish)
 Tirkuar (tithio bird)
 Tirkey (an eagle)
 Toppo (Woodpecker)
 Tigga (Monkey)
 Xalxo (pigeon)
 Xaxa (Crow)
 Xess or Dhan (Paddy)

Culture

Language
Kurukh are traditional speakers of Kurukh, which belongs to the northern branch of the Dravidian family. Just under half still speak this language as their mother tongue. Many have adopted the local lingua francas, Sadri and Odia, as their first languages. This shift to regional languages, especially Sadri, has been most pronounced in West Bengal, Bangladesh, Assam and Tripura, where the Kurukh are mainly tea garden workers and Sadri is the main link language.

Festivals 
The Kurukh celebrate all traditional festivals of the Chota Nagpur plateau: Sarhul, Karma, Dhanbuni, Harihari, Nawakhani, Khariyani etc.

Music and dance 
Since time immemorial The Oraon people have a rich range of folk songs, dances and tales, as well as traditional musical instruments. Both men and women participate in dances, which are performed at social events and festivals. The Mandar, Nagara and Kartal are the main musical instruments. In Kurukh, song is known as "Dandi". Some Kurukh folk dances are war dances (between two Parhas), Karma dance (Karam dandi), Khaddi or Sarhul dance, Phagu, Jadur, jagra, Matha, Benja Nalna (wedding dance) and Chali (courtyard dance).

Marriage tradition
Marriage among Kurukhs is usually arranged by the parents. The parents negotiate a bride price, after which the wedding can take place. On the wedding day, the groom arrives with his friends to the bride's house, and they hold a dance. A pandal is constructed in front of the bride's father's house, and the bride and groom stand on a stone, under which is grain above a plough yoke. A cloth is then thrown over the couple, who are doubly screened by the groom's friends. Then the sindoordaan is done: the groom applies sindoor to the bride's forehead, which is sometimes returned. Afterwards, water is poured over the couple and they return to a separate area of the house to change. When they are emerged, they are considered married. During this entire time, the rest of the party continue to dance.

Dress 
At the turn of the 20th century, Kurukh men wore a loincloth tied around the hips, while women less influenced by other communities would wear a cloth reaching to just above the knee, covering the chest. Today, women traditionally a wear thick cotton sari with detailed stitched borders of purple or red thread. Traditional tattoos include elaborate symmetrical patterns around their forearms, ankles, and chest. Men wear a thick cloth with similar detailed borders as a dhoti or lungi.

Livelihood 
Originally, the Oraons relied on the forest and its goods for an economic livelihood. Unlike many other communities of Jharkhand which practice jhum, the Kurukh community uses plough agriculture. At the turn of the 20th century however, due to the policies of the British colonial government, most of the tribe worked as agricultural labourers for the Zamindars on their own lands. However, recently many have become settled agriculturists, while others became migrant workers.

Administration
In a Kurukh village, the village level political organization is called Parha which consists of post such as Pahan (village priest), Panibharwa (water-bearer of Pahan), Pujar (assistant of Pahan), Bhandari and Chowkidar (watchman). Each has a particular role in religious ceremonies, festivals and solving disputes in the village. The traditional informal educational institution youth dormitory is called Dhumkuria. The public and common meeting place is Akhra where people meet for the purpose of discussion and solving disputes.

Twelve to thirty villages form a Parha council. Each village has a village council, member of village council act as the members of Parha council in the headship of Parha chief. One of the villages in Parha is called Raja (King) village, another  (prime minister) village, another  (clerk of the village), a fourth  (orderly) village and remaining village are called  (subject) village. Raja village has highest social status because headman of this village presides at the meeting of a Parha Panchayat.
The Kurukh are patrilocal and patrilineal. Clan name descends from father to son. The major lineage is known as Bhuinhari Khunt. Bhuinhari means owner of the land. Khunt has two sub groups: the Pahan Khunt and Mahato Khunt. Pahan and Mahato are two main office of Bhuinhari lineage.

Religion

The Oraon follow their traditional religion (Sarnaism), which is based on nature worship. Some of the groups started following Sarnaism in a Hindu style, as the sects of the Bishnu Bhagats, Bacchinda Bhagats, Karmu Bhagats and Tana Bhagats. The Oraons have established several Sarna sects. Oraons worship Sun as biri (a name given for Dharmesh). Kurukhar also believe in Animism.

Most of population is Sarna, which is a religion that is indigenous to Adivasis in the Chota Nagpur Plateau. Sarna perform religious rituals under the shade of a sacred grove. They worship the sun as Biri and the moon as Chando, and call the earth Dharti Aayo (Earth as mother). Chando Biri are the words which are used in Sarna pujas. Dharmesh is their supreme almighty god.

Kamru Bhagats (Oraon or Munda devotees) originated when Oraons acquired special powers after making a pilgrimage to Kamakhya in Assam to pay respect to Durga.

The Tana Bhagat was formed by Oraon saints Jatra Bhagat and Turia Bhagat. Tana Bhagats opposed the taxes imposed on them by the British and staged a Satyagraha movement even before Mahatma Gandhi. All Tana Bhagats were followers of Gandhi during the Independence movement. Tana Bhagats still wear a khadi kurta, dhoti and Gandhi topi (cap) with tricoloured flag in their topi. All Tana Bhagats perform puja to the Mahadeo and the tricolour with a chakra symbol on it, which is fixed at their courtyard.

Among Christian Oraons, there are Roman Catholics and Protestants, the latter of which having several denominations.

In popular culture

In 1957, film-maker Ritwik Ghatak shot a preparatory test film named Oraon on the life of the Adivasis of the Ranchi region in Jharkhand and on the Oraons of Rani Khatanga Village in Jharkhand.

Notable people 

Lazrus Barla, field hockey player
Budhu Bhagat, freedom fighter
Jatra Bhagat, freedom fighter and social reformist
Sudarshan Bhagat, Member of Parliament
Albert Ekka, recipient of India's highest wartime gallantry award Param Vir Chakra
Deep Grace Ekka, Indian hockey player
Michael Kindo, hockey player
Renee Kujur, model
Santiuse Kujur, MP of Assam
Birendra Lakra, Indian hockey player
Provat Lakra, Football player of West Bengal
Sunita Lakra, Indian hockey player
Madhu Mansuri, singer and activist
Nirmal Minz, scholar
Lilima Minz, Indian hockey player
Sonajharia Minz, vice-chancellor to the Sido Kanhu Murmu University
Jual Oram, Ministry of Tribal Affairs, India
Dinesh Oraon, Indian politician currently serving as speaker of Jharkhand legislative assembly and a leader of Bharatiya Janata Party from Jharkhand
Kartik Oraon, Member of Parliament, Lok Sabha
Rameshwar Oraon, former IPS officer and politician
Simon Oraon, environmentalist & Padma Shri awardee
Manisha Panna, football player
Simon Tigga, politician
Dilip Tirkey, MP of Rajya Sabha for Odisha
Ignace Tirkey, hockey player
Manohar Tirkey, politician
Rupa Rani Tirkey, lawn ball player
Biju Toppo, documentary filmmaker
Binita Toppo, hockey player
Namita Toppo, Indian hockey player
Telesphore Toppo, Cardinal
Pyari Xaxa, football player

See also
 Kharia people

References

External links

kurukhworld.com
This article includes material from the 1995 public domain Library of Congress Country Study on India.

Ethnic groups in Bangladesh
Adivasi
Dravidian peoples
Social groups of Delhi
Scheduled Tribes of Odisha
Scheduled Tribes of Jharkhand
Scheduled Tribes of Bihar
Scheduled Tribes of West Bengal
Scheduled Tribes of Chhattisgarh